This is a list of Indian football players (both men and women) who are currently playing or have played for any football club abroad, in any competitive foreign football league.

Players below, have signed, joined or appeared as foreign recruits (footballer) for any football club – that is not based in India (irrespective of whether the player has made an appearance for the team or not).

Few players below, within "Youth men" and "Youth women" sections, have played or currently playing College soccer in professional/amateur college/university conference leagues outside India.

Senior men

Past

Present

Senior women

Past

Present

Youth men

Youth women

See also 

Main pages
List of India international footballers
List of foreign football players in India
List of India international footballers born abroad
Category
Footballers from India
Indian expatriate footballers
Expatriate footballers in India
Miscellaneous
History of Indian football
India national football team
India women's national team

Explanatory notes

References

External links
 Players Abroad — India at Soccerway

 
Football in India
Indian expatriate footballers
Lists of expatriate association football players
Association football player non-biographical articles